Pavlovsk may refer to:

Russia
Pavlovsk, Saint Petersburg, a town in a suburban Pushkinskiy District of Saint Petersburg, Russia
Pavlovsk Urban Settlement, an administrative division and a municipal formation which the town of Pavlovsk in Pavlovsky District of Voronezh Oblast, Russia is incorporated as
Pavlovsk, Russia, several inhabited localities in Russia

Ukraine
Pavlovsk, former name of the city of Mariupol, Ukraine

See also
 Novopavlovsk
 Pavel
 Pavlov (disambiguation)
 Pavlovka (disambiguation)
 Pavlovo
 Pavlovsky (disambiguation)
 Petropavlovsk (disambiguation)